Louis Wyrsch (2 March 1793 – 21 April 1858), also known as Borneo Louis, was a Swiss politician and a military commander of the 19th century.

He was a mercenary for the Netherlands early in his life, partaking in the Napoleonic Wars and Dutch colonial wars. He later became an influential figure in Swiss politics.

Early life
Franz Alois Wyrsch from Buochs Nidwalden was born on 2 March 1793, in Bellinzona. He was the son of Franz Alois, bailiff of the Riviera, commissioner in Bellinzona and captain in the service of Spain, and Marie Konstantia von Flüe. He was the grandson of Benedikt Niklaus von Flüe and the Nephew of Michael von Flüe.

He was educated at the Royal Seminary of San Pablo in Valencia and his father's regiment in Spain. After his father's death in 1807, he returned to Nidwalden and finished his education at the Rheinau conventual school in 1812. Wyrsch then went to do an apprenticeship in Belfort.

In 1824 Wyrsch married Johanna van den Berg (who went by Silla in Malay), a woman of Malaysia of Java. She stayed in the Dutch Indies while he returned to Nidwalden, Switzerland in 1832 with two of the eldest children from that relationship. Two years later, in 1834 Wyrsch married Theresia Stockmann, the daughter of Felix Josef Stockmann.

Career
Wyrsch joined the Royal Netherlands Army as a soldier in 1814 and took part in the Battle of Waterloo.

He joined the Dutch colonial troops in Java, Bali and Borneo in 1815. He was a military and civil commander on the southern and eastern coasts of Borneo (1829-1832).

In 1832 he returned to Nidwalden where he was a bailiff between 1834 and 1840 and a major of Nidwalden's army between 1834 and 1847.

Wyrsch was first elected Nidwalden's head of state (landammann) on 25 April 1841. He was reelected in 1845, 1848, 1849, 1851, 1853, 1855 and 1857. He was commander of the Nidwalden battalion during the Sonderbund war in 1847, a member of commission which drafted the Swiss constitution in 1849 and president of the municipality of Ennetbürgen between 1850 and 1857.

His rapid rise in the Dutch colonial army was distinguished by his laying the foundations for Borneo's infrastructure.

In Nidwalden, he bought the Au mill in Ennetbürgen in 1839 and earned his living as a miller.

His moderate liberal and military experience made him politically widely accepted.

Swiss Constitution 
He was a drafting member of the Swiss Constitution.

The Swiss Constitution was created by Ulrich Ochsenbein who headed it along with the following other members: Jonas Furrer, Jakob Robert Steiger, Franz Jauch, Melchior Diethelm, Alois Michel, Caspar Jenny-Becker, Franz Müller, Jean-François Marcellin Bussard, Josef Munzinger, Johann Georg Fürstenberger, later Felix Sarasin, Karl Spitteler, Johann Georg Böschenstein, Johann Konrad Oertli, Wilhelm Matthias Näff, Raget Abys, Friedrich Frey-Herosé, Johann Konrad Kern, Giacomo Luvini-Perseghini, Henri Druey, Maurice Barman, later Franz Kaspar Zen Ruffinen and Louis Rilliet.

He was made knight 4th class of the Military Order of William of the Netherlands on 21 October 1832.

Death
Wyrsch died on 21 April 1858 in Ennetbürgen.

References

People from Nidwalden
People from Bellinzona
19th-century Swiss people
Swiss mercenaries
Swiss military officers
Swiss politicians
People of the Dutch East Indies
Knights Fourth Class of the Military Order of William
1793 births
1858 deaths
19th-century Swiss military personnel
Swiss people of the Napoleonic Wars